Cecil Arthur Franklin (9 March 1887 – 28 January 1961), was chairman of the publishers Routledge from 1948 until his death in 1961.

The son of the merchant banker Arthur Ellis Franklin and his wife, Caroline ( Jacob), Cecil Franklin was educated at the Jewish boarding school in Brighton run by Maurice Jacobs, joined  the publishers Routledge in 1906, became a director in 1912, and was chairman from 1948 until his death in 1961.

References

1887 births
Place of birth missing
1961 deaths
Place of death missing
English Jews
English publishers (people)
Cecil
20th-century English businesspeople